Bad Country is an album by singer, multi-instrumentalist and songwriter Leon Russell. The album was recorded in 2003 and released in 2008 by Leon Russell Records. It was by produced with all new songs written and performed by Leon.

Rachel Leibrock with Sacramento News & Review, newsreview.com, reviewed Bad Country on Nov. 11, 2009, writing: 2008’s Bad Country, a collection of honky-tonk-influenced tracks on which the 67-year-old musician plays with the skill of a veteran but with the enthusiasm of that energetic teen who first discovered the power of live music..

Track listing
 A Little Bit of Love – 2:12 	
 Honkytonk Dream – 2:12
 Oklahoma Girl – 3:18
 California Dreams – 2:59
 Hungry Eyes – 2:25
 Real Love – 2:47
 Rio Grande – 3:01
 Sweet Magic Love – 3:01
 Tennessee Hayride – 0:59
 Come Lay with Me – 3:00
 Bad Country –	3:35

References

External links
Leon Russell discography
Leon Russell lyrics 
Leon Russell NAMM Oral History Program Interview (2012)

2008 albums
Leon Russell albums
Albums produced by Leon Russell